Bartosz Warchoł (born 16 January 1992) is a Polish cyclist, who last rode for UCI Continental team .

Major results

2014
 3rd Time trial, National Under-23 Road Championships
 3rd Overall Peace Race U23
 9th Overall Carpathian Couriers Race
1st Stage 4
 10th Tour Bohemia
2015
 Visegrad 4 Bicycle Race
1st GP Polski
6th GP Czech Republic
 9th Overall Szlakiem Grodów Piastowskich
2016
 5th GP Polski, Visegrad 4 Bicycle Race
 10th Overall Course de Solidarność et des Champions Olympiques
 10th Overall Czech Cycling Tour
2017
 4th Overall Bałtyk–Karkonosze Tour
 10th Korona Kocich Gór
2018
 6th Overall Tour of Małopolska

References

External links

1992 births
Living people
Polish male cyclists
Place of birth missing (living people)